Rudolph Delson (born March 26, 1975) is an American author best known for his 2007 debut novel, Maynard and Jennica, published by Houghton Mifflin.  Maynard and Jennica is a modern love story set in New York City.

Rudolph Delson was born and raised in San Jose, California, and his mother was a sculptor and his father an engineer. While growing up, he made a living as a litigation associate at the law firm of Simpson Thacher & Bartlett LLP, a paralegal at the Antitrust Division of the United States Department of Justice, and as a law clerk for James R. Browning of the United States Court of Appeals. He now lives in Brooklyn, New York. He graduated from Stanford University (BA & BS, 1997) and NYU Law School (JD, 2002).

While at NYU Delson was a member of the NYU Law Review, as a Notes Editor. His mother is now a real estate agent, and his father is retired.

External links
  Publishers Weekly, June 25, 2007
  The Village Voice,February 23, 2000
  The Willow Glen Resident, August 26, 1998
Read Rudolph's articles on the 5th Estate blog

21st-century American novelists
Stanford University alumni
New York University School of Law alumni
Living people
1975 births
Writers from Brooklyn
Writers from San Jose, California
American male novelists
21st-century American male writers
Novelists from New York (state)